Madura is a genus of leaf-footed bugs in the family Coreidae. There are at least three described species in Madura.

Species
These three species belong to the genus Madura:
 Madura fuscoclavata Stål, 1860 i c g
 Madura longicornis Stål, 1862 i c g
 Madura perfida Stål, 1862 i c g b
Data sources: i = ITIS, c = Catalogue of Life, g = GBIF, b = Bugguide.net

References

Further reading

External links

Articles created by Qbugbot
Coreini
Coreidae genera